Sree Sankara College is a Private, Higher Educational Institution that was founded in Kaladay, India in 1954 by Swami Agamananda, a scholar of the Hindu Temple Sri Ramakrishna Advaita Ashram.

The institution was established with a view to educate attendees on the teachings of Adi Sankaracharya and to enshrine the birthplace as a cultural hotspot. It consists of 21 Departments offering an Undergraduate Degree, Graduate Degree and a Doctorate Degree. The College also consists of learning programs with an alternate, smaller curriculum that awards a Diploma.

The institution was raised to the status of a First Grade College in 1956. It is affiliated to the Mahatma Gandhi University.

In June 1960, the patronage of the college became vested in the Jagadguru Sri Sri Sankaracharya Swamigal of Dakshinamnaya. Currently, Sri Sri Bharathi Theertha Mahaswamigal, of Sringeri Mutt, steers the administration through a board of directors with Sri. K. Anand as the managing director.

The National Assessment and Accreditation Council (NAAC), a statutory body of the UGC has accredited the college B++ Grade with 2.80 CGPA on a four-point scale. The Departments of Economics, English, Chemistry, Sanskrit and Microbiology are approved Research Centers under the Mahatma Gandhi University.

Departments

Science
Department of Mathematics: The department of mathematics was established in the year 1957. Prof. Lakshmi Nataraj was the first Head of the Department. The department offers UG program in Mathematics as the core subject. Along with this, the department offers complimentary course in Mathematics to B.Sc. Physics, B.Sc. Chemistry and B.Sc. Statistics students. The department offers  "Applicable Mathematics" as its open course, which largely helps students who are preparing competitive exams.
Physics: The department of Physics was established in 1957, as one among the first departments in the college. Being about 60 years of existence, the department is marching towards the status of a full-fledged center with an average strength of 40 undergraduate students and 15 postgraduate students. 
Chemistry: Chemistry department was established in 1959. The department is enriched with 8 faculty members, 3 laboratory assistants, 150 UG students and 35 PG students and 6 Ph.D. students. 
Botany: The Department of Botany was established in 1954 offering B.Sc. in Botany. Presently the department is having 4 faculty members including 3 guest faculties 
Zoology: The Department of Zoology was established in the year 1954. The Department is having 4 faculty members and offering B.Sc. in Zoology.
Statistics: The department of Statistics was established in the year 1993. The department offers undergraduate program in Statistics with Mathematics and Computer Science as the complementary subjects. The department also offers M.Sc. in Statistics
Microbiology: The Department of Microbiology was established in the year 1995 and has been upgraded as a Research Center in November 2009. This is the only college in Mahatma Gandhi University which offers M.Sc. Microbiology course in the aided category and is the only Department in the State of Kerala to be upgraded as Research Center in Microbiology.
Biosciences: The Department of Biosciences offers B.Sc. in Microbiology, B.Sc. in Biotechnology and M.Sc. in Biochemistry.
Environments Science: PG Department of Environmental Science and Management is a multidisciplinary course commenced in August 2005 under the affiliation of Mahatma Gandhi University.

Arts
History:The Department of History was started in 1966 as a UG department with History as Core Course
Economics: The department of Economics which had its origin way back in 1958 has always been in the main stream of academic life of Sree Sankara College. The first batch of BA Economics came out in 1960. The major breakthrough of the department lies in introducing a post graduate course namely MA Economics in 1962. The recognition of the department as a research centre (1999) in Economics is an important milestone in the development of the department.
English:The Post Graduate department of English offers BA in English, MA in English and PhD in English. The department follows a  student-centered approach out of the ten-member faculty, six members have more than twenty years of teaching experience.Special stress is given to communicative language learning, providing ample scope to hone the language skills of students. Special care is taken to foster an ethical value system that will ensure character moulding.
Hindi: BA Hindi commenced in 1965. Under graduate Department of Hindi has successfully accomplished its goul of quality enhancement in all the related areas.
Sanskrit: The department of Sanskrit started functioning in 1954, the year in which the college was founded. The college was affiliated to the then University of Travancore, which subserquently was renamed as University of Kerala after the re organisation of states. Under Graduate and Intermediate courses in Sanskrit were offered from the beginning. As the founding fathers of the college had the intention of promoting and popularising Sanskrit and the teachings of that Great Son of India - Adi Sankaracharya, the threast area in the Under Graduate course is Sankara Vedanta. The students who opted for Vedanta as major subjects in the above courses enjoyed full fee concession till 1972.

DDU Kaushal Kendra
BVoc Broadcasting and Journalism
BVoc Renewable Energy Management
BVoc Tourism and Hospitality
Short term Diploma Courses(1 year) in Event Management, Filmmaking, Solar Photovoltaic Module Installation and maintenance

Notable alumni

 Kurian Joseph, Honourable justice 
 Muralee Thummarukudy, UN Chief, Disaster Risk Reduction
 Bose Krishnamachari, Artist, Founder Member & President - Kochi Biennale
 Jayaram, Actor
 Dinesh Prabhakar, Actor
 Benny Behanan, Member of Parliament
 K. Babu, Politician
 Asha Sharath, Actor
 Babu Namboothiri, Actor
 Dinesh Prabhakar, Actor
 Shritha Sivadas, Actor

External links

 

Arts and Science colleges in Kerala
Universities and colleges in Ernakulam district
Colleges affiliated to Mahatma Gandhi University, Kerala
1954 establishments in India
Educational institutions established in 1954